Ahmet Kurt Pasha was an Albanian pasha and the founder and the first ruler of the Pashalik of Berat, a semi-autonomous area within the Ottoman Empire. He descended from the Muzaka family, which in the late Middle Ages had founded the Lordship of Berat.

Creation of the Pashalik
Ahmet Kurt Pasha managed to conspire with the Sublime Porte against Mehmed Pasha Bushati in 1774, thus creating the Pashalik of Berat. For his service, the Sultan gave him territories in central Albania. He then managed to extend his pashalik until his death in 1787, incorporating territories of all central Albania, bordering to the north with the Pashalik of Scutari and to the south with the Pashalik of Yanina.

See also
Ibrahim Pasha of Berat
Ali Pasha of Yanina

Sources
"History of Albanian People" Albanian Academy of Science. 

18th-century Albanian people
Ahmet Kurt